The following lists the top 100 singles of 2000  in Australia from the Australian Recording Industry Association (ARIA) End of Year singles chart.

"I'm Outta Love" by Anastacia was the biggest song of the year, peaking at No. 1 for five weeks and staying in the top 50 for 20 weeks. The longest stay at No. 1 was joint by Anastacia with "I'm Outta Love" which spent 5 weeks at the top spot, and it was joint by *NSYNC's "Bye Bye Bye".

Notes

References

Australian record charts
2000 in Australian music
2000 record charts